Acrocercops leucomochla is a moth of the family Gracillariidae. It is known from Queensland and New South Wales, Australia.

References

leucomochla
Moths of Australia
Moths described in 1926